Moses Judah Hays (1799 – 12 November 1861) was a Canadian businessman and municipal leader. He established and managed the first water-works in Montreal, and served as the city's chief of police from 1854 until his death.

Early life
Moses Judah Hays was born into a prominent Jewish family in Montreal. His mother, Brandele Abigail (1762–1840), was the sister of fur trader David David. His father, Andrew Hays (1742–1835), one of the founders of the Shearith Israel Synagogue, came from a well-established Sephardic family which emigrated from Holland to the United States in the first quarter of the eighteenth century. Among his relatives were lawyer Daniel P. Hays, ophthalmologist Isaac Hays, police officer , and painter .

Career
Hays began his career as a clerk in Montreal's Royal Engineers Department, and continued to contribute to civic life for many years thereafter. He joined the Montreal Mechanics' Institution in 1829. When Montreal was incorporated as a city in 1832, Hays established its first municipal water system, which he operated until selling it to the city at a loss in 1845. He was also a director of Joseph Masson's gas company and of the Montreal Provident and Savings Bank, and between 1836 and 1840 served as a judge on the Court of Special Sessions which administered the city. In 1837, he and Benjamin Hart were appointed magistrates, becoming the first Jews in Canada to be appointed to that office.

He opened Hays House in Dalhousie Square in 1847. The four-storey block of buildings included a hotel, a shopping area, and a theatre, and featured a panoramic view extending over the entire city. It became a centre of activity for Montreal's nouveau riche. The theatre hosted concerts by Anna Bishop, Nicolas-Charles Bochsa, the Germania Musical Society, and others, as well as theatrical performances. After the burning of the Parliament Buildings in April 1849, Hays leased the building to Parliament to serve as its temporary seat. It was destroyed in the Great Fire of 1852.

Hays was active in the Montreal Jewish community, serving as gabbai and later president of the Shearith Israel Synagogue. He planned and superintended the construction of a new building for the Synagogue, which opened in 1838. In 1847, he and Rev. Abraham de Sola organized the Hebrew Philanthropic Society to assist poor Jewish immigrants.

Outside the Jewish community Hays served as president of the Montreal Agricultural Society, secretary of the Montreal Mechanics' Institute, and a member of the Provincial Grand Lodge. In 1849 he was appointed to Montreal's Central Board of Health. In 1854 he was installed as Chief of Police.

Hays died of a sudden heart attack on the morning of 12 November 1861.

Notes

References

1799 births
1861 deaths
19th-century Canadian Jews
Anglophone Quebec people
Montreal police chiefs